The Cheerful Fraud is a 1927  American silent comedy film directed by William A. Seiter and starring Reginald Denny,  Gertrude Olmstead, and Otis Harlan. It was produced and distributed by Universal Pictures. It is based on a 1925 novel of the same title by British writer Kenneth Robert Gordon Browne.

Synopsis
After encountering her in a London rainstorm, Sir Michael Fairlie pretends to be the new employee at the residence owned by the Bytheways in order to spend time with their social secretary. Meanwhile, a notorious crook turns up at the house pretending to be Sir Michael, with an eye on stealing family jewels. The confusion is compounded when a female blackmailer also arrives.

Cast

Preservation status
The film is preserved at the UCLA Film and Television Archive.

References

Bibliography
 Goble, Alan. The Complete Index to Literary Sources in Film. Walter de Gruyter, 1999.

External links

1927 films
American silent feature films
Films directed by William A. Seiter
Universal Pictures films
American black-and-white films
1920s English-language films
1927 drama films
1927 comedy films
Films set in London
Films based on British novels
1920s American films
Silent American comedy films